The Federal Prison Camp, Duluth (FPC Duluth) is a minimum-security federal prison in the north central United States, located in Minnesota for male offenders. It is operated by the Federal Bureau of Prisons, a division of the United States Department of Justice.

Inmate life
On March 29, 2011, a reporter from a CBS affiliate station in Minnesota interviewed Denny Hecker (15080-041), an inmate at FPC Duluth. Hecker, who made millions of dollars as the owner of car dealerships, was serving a 10-year sentence after pleading guilty to bankruptcy fraud in 2010. The reporter, Esme Murphy, described the interview:

He was dressed in surplus army fatigues from the 1960s, the uniform of all inmates.
. . . 
He described a life that to some might not sound so bad. He works out every day with weights in a fully equipped prison gym. He says the food is good. There is a salad bar and at times fresh cinnamon rolls for breakfast. There is a prison movie theater he can go to. The former auto mogul sleeps in a bunk bed in a room with three other men in a residential dorm-like building.  Now he said "the minutes are like hours, the hours like days." Sometimes he spends hours looking at the planes fly overhead to the nearby Air Force base. In prison, he had his first job interview in more than 30 years. He wanted to teach business to other inmates, instead he was assigned to wash floors.

Hecker has since been transferred to the Federal Correctional Institution, Loretto, a low-security facility in Pennsylvania with an adjacent minimum-security satellite prison camp. He was released July 3, 2018.

Notable inmates (current and former)

See also

List of U.S. federal prisons
Federal Bureau of Prisons
Incarceration in the United States

References

External links

Prisons in Minnesota
Duluth